Koeputkiaikuinen ja Simon enkelit (The Test-tube Adult and Simo's Angels) is a 1979 Finnish comedy film directed, written and starring Spede Pasanen, along with the typical comic-cast of Simo Salminen, Vesa-Matti Loiri, Tapio Hämäläinen and Olavi Ahonen.

Similar to his debut film X-Paroni, Pasanen portrays a dual-role. Because Spede struggled to find funding for his movies throughout the 1970s, the film is only his second feature to be filmed entirely in colour (also his third film over-all to be filmed in colour). Leikkikalugangsteri was filmed principally in black and white with the film's ending being in colour, while Pohjantähteet (released the same year) was the first Spede film to be entirely in colour.

Plot summary
Mathematician Mauno Mutikainen (Pasanen) is accidentally pronounced dead as a result of an operation where a splinter is being removed from his finger, which he got by scratching his head. He is then cloned into a "test-tube adult", a play on the phrase test-tube child, named Richard Ilyevitch Jyrä by his creator, father and mother, Dr. Jyrä (Hämäläinen), his name is intended to appeal to both American and Soviet sensibilities.

Loiri and Ahonen play the roles of gangsters attempting to kidnap Jyrä and/or Mutikainen, thinking they are the same person. Both would reprise their roles for 1980's Tup-akka-lakko. Additionally Loiri portrays a slew of characters such as a drunk hockey-fan attempting to get to Moscow and making a guest-appearance as Uuno Turhapuro at the end.

Simo Salminen once more plays a character named after himself who is the head of a detective agency called Simon Enkelit (an obvious take on Charlie's Angels). The angels were portrayed by Rita Polster, Kirsti Wallasvaara, Ritva Vepsä and Merja Tammi.

References

External links

1979 films
Spede Pasanen
1970s Finnish-language films
1979 comedy films
Finnish comedy films